The Mbatovi Ecoreserve is a protected area and nature reserve located in the Paraguarí Department, Paraguay, in the middle of the Cordillera de los Altos, between Paraguarí and Piribebuy, in the Central Litoral. The area was preserved by its owners to protect the biological diversity of this natural area. It was the first Environmental Service business to be registered in the General Directorate of Public Registries of Paraguay.

History
In 1999, Jacinto Santa María and Marta González Ayala, both nature lovers, started looking for a natural space for a weekend retreat. They found a place in the middle of the Cordillera de los Altos, near Paraguay, with a beautiful view of the hills and the valley of Pirayu.

They bought the property and decided to keep it conserved as a nature reserve, and to share it with the public. In 2003, Mbatovi was registered as a protected area in the General Directorate of Public Registries as the first Environmental Service of Paraguay. The Eco Reserva Mbatovi opened to the public in January 2006. It is designated a special adventure park by the National Tourist Interest (the National Tourism Secretary of Paraguay).

Landscape
The value of the reserve rests mainly in its beauty, accessibility and diversity of ecosystems available to study in a small area. There is an excellent panoramic view: It is possible to see the Cerro Santo Tomas, el Cerro Hu and the Cerro Pero to the south, and towards the east, the Valley of Pirayu and the Cerro Mbatovi.

Native species
The area has unpolluted streams with various dams, where you can find Chachi, a very rare species of fern in danger of extinction, as well as many different types of plants such as maiden's hair, lichens, cactus and wild orchids, Small natural caves make the environment extremely peaceful.

On the side of the streams are deep forests with mature trees and much natural regeneration. There are more than a hundred native species present.

There are many local bird species as well as a variety of reptiles and mammals such as the agouti paca, acutí sayju, aguara'í,  tapití  and different species of armadillos.

Activities
The reserve offers highly qualified instructors and guides and a secure environment for the study of nature.

Mbatovi also offers activities for management groups, designed to influence in the attitudes and values of the participants, using a lively focus. The objective of these activities is to develop focused competences related to emotional intelligence, change capacity, group work and leadership.

Location
Access to the reserve is in the kilometer 72 of the Paraguari-Piribebuy road, on top of the mountains, 10 km away from the center of Paraguarí.

The reserve is open on Saturdays, Sundays and holidays.

References

External links
 Reserva Mbatovi
 Secretaria Nacional de Turismo

Protected areas of Paraguay
Paraguarí Department